Bonang is a Javanese musical instrument. Bonang may also refer to
Bonang, a village in Rembang Regency, Indonesia
Bonang River in Victoria, Australia
Bonang Highway in south-eastern Australia 
Bonang Matheba (born 1987), South African TV and radio personality
Sunan Bonang (1465–1525), Indonesian nobleman
Neoglyphidodon bonang, a species of damselfish